Bernhard Langer (born 27 August 1957) is a German professional golfer. He is a two-time Masters champion and was one of the world's leading golfers throughout the 1980s and 1990s. In 1986, he became the sport's first official number one ranked player following the creation of the OWGR.

Langer is one of five golfers who have won professional golf events on all six continents where golf is played. He has victories on all the premiere tours, with 42 wins on the European Tour (2nd most all-time), three on the PGA Tour, and numerous international victories; including wins on the Japan Golf Tour, Asian Tour, Australasian Tour, and the Tour de las Américas.

The highlights of Langer's career are his two major championships. His first major win came at the 1985 Masters Tournament, where Langer won by two strokes over runners-up Seve Ballesteros, Raymond Floyd and Curtis Strange. His second major came at the 1993 Masters Tournament with a four-shot victory over Chip Beck. Langer has also finished runner-up on two occasions at The Open Championship (1981 and 1984). In 2020 Langer became the oldest player in Masters history to make the tournament cut, at age 63.

After turning 50, Langer has established himself as the most successful player in the history of the PGA Tour Champions. He has won a record 11 senior major championships, been the money leader in a record 11 seasons and a record 7 times in a row. He is tied for the most PGA Tour Champions career wins and is one of only two players who have achieved the career Senior Grand Slam (winning each of the five major championships at least once during one's career). He has won the 2010, 2014, 2017 and 2019 Senior Open Championship, the 2010 U.S. Senior Open, the 2016 and 2017 Regions Tradition, the 2014, 2015 and 2016 Constellation Senior Players Championship, and the 2017 Senior PGA Championship.

Life and work

Langer was born on 27 August 1957 in the village of Anhausen, which today is a part of Diedorf municipality, near Augsburg, Bavaria, Germany. He turned professional in 1972 and has won many events in Europe and the United States, including The Masters in 1985 and 1993. He was the inaugural World Number 1 when the Official World Golf Rankings were introduced in 1986. He was elected to the World Golf Hall of Fame in 2001 (but deferred his induction until 2002). He ranks second in career wins on the European Tour (42) and has also played regularly on the U.S.-based PGA Tour, especially in the late 1980s and since 2000. He finished in a tie for fifth at The Open Championship the month before he turned 48, and regained a ranking in the top 100 three months before he turned 50. Along with Gary Player, David Graham, Hale Irwin and Justin Rose, Langer is one of only five players to have won official tournaments on all six continents on which golf is played. He played on ten Ryder Cup teams (1981, 1983, 1985, 1987, 1989, 1991, 1993, 1995, 1997, 2002), winning five times, and was the non-playing captain of the victorious European team in 2004.

Langer has battled the yips, having a strong tendency to flinch or twitch during putting. He has changed his putter grip numerous times in an attempt to cure the problem. In the 1991 Ryder Cup, Langer missed a five-foot putt that would have tied the Ryder Cup and allowed the European team to retain the trophy.

Langer has been married to his American wife Vikki Carol since 1984. They have four children: Jackie, Stefan, Christina, and Jason. They maintain homes in Langer's birthplace of Anhausen and in Boca Raton, Florida. Langer is known to be a devout Christian. Daughter Christina is married to professional baseball player Chase De Jong.

In 2006, in recognition of his contribution to the sport of golf, Langer was appointed as an honorary Officer of the Most Excellent Order of the British Empire (OBE). In his native Germany, Langer has received multiple honors, including the Order of Merit of the Federal Republic of Germany and the Silver Laurel Leaf (Silbernes Lorbeerblatt), which is the highest German sport award. In July 2016, he was inducted into Germany's Sport Hall of Fame.

Senior career 
In 2015, Langer became the first player since Arnold Palmer (1984–85) to win the Constellation Senior Players Championship in back-to-back years. It was also the last year that Langer was allowed to anchor the long putter, a technique which the USGA banned effective 1 January 2016. At the 2016 Masters, Langer was in the second to last group in the final round only two shots back, but fell to a tie for 24th.

In 2016, Langer claimed the Regions Tradition title for his sixth senior major championship. He won by a six-stroke margin over Olin Browne. This was his 100th professional win and the first time Langer had won the title.  His capture of the 2017 Senior PGA Championship completed a career Grand Slam. The Regions Tradition title had also made him only the second golfer, after Jack Nicklaus, with wins in four different senior major championships. Later in 2016 he wrote history by becoming the first three-time winner of the Constellation Senior Players Championship and wins it for third straight year. The result also meant that only Nicklaus had won more senior majors than Langer. In November, he won his fourth Charles Schwab Cup and his third in a row.

In January 2017, US president Donald Trump used an incorrect story about Langer's failed attempt at voting in the United States to justify an investigation of voter fraud in the 2016 US presidential election. The story was covered in several media outlets. Since Langer is a citizen only of Germany, he was not eligible to vote.

Langer won three more senior majors in 2017 to become the most decorated player in the senior ranks of all time. In total, he won seven titles – but he did not win the season-ending Schwab Cup. Instead, Kevin Sutherland, who was fifth in the Order of Merit heading into the final event of the season, won that to lift the trophy in what was his only win of the season. Langer subsequently called the playoff process 'unfair'.

In September 2018, Langer received the Payne Stewart Award.

In November 2018, Langer won his fifth Charles Schwab Cup. This brought his lifetime earnings in the Charles Schwab Cup to $7,000,000.

In July 2019, Langer won his fourth Senior Open Championship at Royal Lytham & St. Annes Golf Club. This marked his eleventh victory in a senior major championship.

In March 2020, Langer won the Cologuard Classic for his 41st victory on the PGA Tour Champions.

In October 2021, Langer won the Dominion Energy Charity Classic in a playoff over Doug Barron. This made him the oldest man to win a PGA Tour Champions event at 64 years, 1 month and 27 days.

In November 2021, Langer won his sixth Charles Schwab Cup for the combined 2020–21 season. The Cup was awarded for play over two seasons due to the COVID-19 pandemic.

Langer's total career earnings through 2021 on the PGA Tour and PGA Tour Champions were more than US$42 million.

In February 2022, Langer won the Chubb Classic for the fourth time. At 64 years, 5 months, 23 days he broke his own record for oldest winner on the PGA Tour Champions and won for the 16th straight season. This win left him two behind Hale Irwin for the career PGA Tour Champions record. In November 2022, Langer won the TimberTech Championship for the third time. This was his first win as a 65-year-old and his 44th win on PGA Tour Champions.

In February 2023, Langer successfully defended his title at the Chubb Classic. This was his 45th win on the PGA Tour Champions, tying him with Hale Irwin. Langer birdied five of his last seven holes in the final round to shoot 65 and earn a three-stroke victory.

Professional wins (121)

PGA Tour wins (3)

PGA Tour playoff record (1–2)

European Tour wins (42)

*Note: Tournament shortened to 54 holes due to rain.
*Ballesteros and Langer agreed to share the 1986 Trophée Lancôme after failing light caused play to halt after four holes of a playoff.
*Langer and Montgomerie agreed to share the 2002 Volvo Masters Andalucía after failing light caused play to halt after two holes of a playoff.

European Tour playoff record (8–6–2)

Japan Golf Tour wins (1)

Japan Golf Tour playoff record (0–1)

Asian Tour wins (1)

1Co-sanctioned by the PGA Tour of Australasia

PGA Tour of Australasia wins (2)

1Co-sanctioned by the Asian Tour

Asia Golf Circuit wins (1)

South American Tour wins (2)

Other German wins (13)
1975 German National Open Championship
1977 German National Open Championship
1979 German National Open Championship, German PGA Championship
1984 German National Open Championship
1985 German National Open Championship
1986 German National Open Championship
1987 German National Open Championship
1988 German National Open Championship
1989 German National Open Championship
1990 German National Open Championship
1991 German National Open Championship
1992 German National Open Championship
Note: the German National Open Championship is a different event from the German Open listed five times in the European Tour wins section. That event was open to all comers, German and non-German. The German National Open Championship is "open" to German golfers whether they are amateur or professional.

Other wins (12)

Other playoff record (2–0)

PGA Tour Champions wins (45)

*Note: Tournament shortened to 36 holes due to weather.

PGA Tour Champions playoff record (7–9)

European Senior Tour wins (7)

European Senior Tour playoff record (0–2)

Other senior wins (1)

Major championships

Wins (2)

Results timeline
Results not in chronological order in 2020.

WD = Withdrew
DQ = Disqualified
CUT = missed the halfway cut
"T" indicates a tie for a place.
NT = No tournament due to COVID-19 pandemic

Summary

Most consecutive cuts made – 8 (1994 Masters – 1996 Masters)
Longest streak of top-10s – 2 (three times)

Results in The Players Championship

CUT = missed the halfway cut
"T" indicates a tie for a place

Results in World Golf Championships

1Cancelled due to 9/11

QF, R16, R32, R64 = Round in which player lost in match play
"T" = Tied
NT = No tournament

Senior major championships

Wins (11)

Results timeline
Results are not in chronological order before 2021.

CUT = missed the halfway cut
"T" indicates a tie for a place
NT = No tournament due to COVID-19 pandemic

Team appearances
World Cup (representing Germany): 1976, 1977, 1978, 1979, 1980, 1990 (winners), 1991, 1992, 1993 (individual winner), 1994, 1996, 2006 (winners)
Ryder Cup (representing Europe): 1981, 1983, 1985 (winners), 1987 (winners), 1989 (tied – retained trophy), 1991, 1993, 1995 (winners), 1997 (winners), 2002 (winners), 2004 (non-playing captain – winners)
Hennessy Cognac Cup (representing the Continent of Europe): 1976, 1978, 1980, 1982 (captain)
Four Tours World Championship (representing Europe): 1985 (captain), 1986 (captain), 1987 (captain), 1989 (captain), 1990
Alfred Dunhill Cup (representing Germany): 1992, 1994, 2000
Seve Trophy (representing Continental Europe): 2000 (winners)
UBS Cup (representing the Rest of the World): 2001, 2002, 2003 (tie), 2004
Wendy's 3-Tour Challenge (representing Champions Tour): 2010, 2012, 2013

See also
List of golfers with most PGA Tour Champions wins
List of golfers with most European Tour wins

Notes and references

External links

 

German male golfers
European Tour golfers
PGA Tour golfers
PGA Tour Champions golfers
Winners of men's major golf championships
Winners of senior major golf championships
World Golf Hall of Fame inductees
Ryder Cup competitors for Europe
Recipients of the Cross of the Order of Merit of the Federal Republic of Germany
People from Augsburg (district)
Sportspeople from Swabia (Bavaria)
Sportspeople from Boca Raton, Florida
1957 births
Living people